"Trumpets" is a single by DJ Sak Noel and Salvi featuring Jamaican singer Sean Paul. The song was released on April 25, 2016, on iTunes. The official audio was released on March 13, 2016, and its music video was released on April 24, 2016.

Chart performance
"Trumpets" charted in Romania and Lebanon due to strong radio airplay, and reached number one and number three, respectively.

Cultural impact
In June 2016, just barely a month after its initial release, the song became an instant hit in the Philippines after Filipino comedian Vice Ganda started dancing to the song on the noontime show It's Showtime. This led to a viral dance craze on the Internet called the "Trumpets Challenge"., as well as the longest-running noontime show, Eat Bulaga! had a segment also called the "Trumpets Dance Challenge" after a video announcement from Sak Noel.

Track listing
Digital download
"Trumpets" (featuring Sean Paul) [Radio Mix] – 3:26
"Trumpets" (featuring Sean Paul) [Extended Mix] – 3:55

Charts

Weekly charts

Year-end charts

References

Songs about trumpets
2016 singles
2016 songs
Internet memes
Sak Noel songs
Sean Paul songs
Songs written by Sean Paul